The Amiot 110, also known as the Amiot-SECM 110, was a French prototype interceptor designed and built in 1929.

Development
The Amiot 110 was designed as a contender in the so-called "Jockey" lightweight interceptor contest, competing against nine other types. It was a braced parasol wing monoplane with an all-metal structure and metal skinned fuselage. The first prototype had a fabric covered wing, replaced by metal skinning in the second.  It had fixed, conventional landing gear; the stub wing behind the gear was part of a jettisonable fuel tank.

Operational history
It first flew in June 1928 and looked a promising candidate to win the "Jockey" contest. However it crashed on 1 July 1929, killing the pilot due to several loose rivets and integrity flaws. No further production went ahead after a second prototype was deemed inferior to the Nieuport-Delage NiD 62.

Specifications

References

1920s French fighter aircraft
110